Mweru may refer to:

Lake Mweru - a lake on the border between Zambia and Congo
Mweru-Luapula - a term for the Luapula River/Lake Mweru system, valley or geographical area
Lake Mweru Wantipa - a small lake between Lake Mweru and Lake Tanganyika
Mweru Marshes - an alternative name for Lake Mweru Wantipa in a periodic dry phase
Mweru Wantipa National Park - a wildlife reserve on Lake Mweru Wantipa